In clothing, a collar is the part of a shirt, dress, coat or blouse that fastens around or frames the neck.  Among clothing construction professionals, a collar is differentiated from other necklines such as revers and lapels, by being made from a separate piece of fabric, rather than a folded or cut part of the same piece of fabric used for the main body of the garment.

A collar may be permanently attached to the main body of the garment (e.g. by stitching) or detachable.

Word usage 
The Oxford English Dictionary traces collar in its modern meaning to c. 1300, when collars served as neck-protecting armour.

History 
Today's shirt collars descend from the rectangular band of linen around the neck of 16th century shirts. Separate ruffs exist alongside attached ruffled collars from the mid-16th century, usually to allow starching and other fine finishing, or to make collar-laundering easier.

During the medieval period and sporadically thereafter, people wore ornamental collars as a form of jewelry.

Terminology
 Band – a strip of fabric that fastens around the neck, perpendicular to the body of the garment, to which a collar proper may be attached.
 Collar stiffeners, bones or stays – strips of baleen, metal, horn, mother of pearl, or plastic, rounded at one end and pointed at the other, inserted into a man's shirt collar to stiffen it and prevent the points from curling up; usually inserted into the underside of the collar through small slits but sometimes permanently sewn in place.
 Points – the corners of a collar; in a buttoned-down collar, the points are fitted with buttonholes that attach to small buttons on the body of the shirt to hold the collar neatly in place.
 Spread – the distance between the points of a shirt collar.
 Stand – the band on a coat or shirt collar that supports the collar itself.

Types
Collars can be categorized as:
 Standing or stand-up, fitting up around the neck and not lying on the shoulders.
 Turnover, standing around the neck and then folded or rolled over.
 Flat or falling, lying flat on the shoulders.

Collars may also be stiffened, traditionally with starch; modern wash-and-wear shirt collars may be stiffened with interfacing or may include metal or plastic collar stays. Shirt collars which are not starched are described as soft collars. The shape of collars is also controlled by the shape of the neckline to which they are attached. Most collars are fitted to a jewel neck, a neckline sitting at the base of the neck all around; if the garment opens down the front, the top edges may be folded back to form lapels and a V-shaped opening, and the cut of the collar will be adjusted accordingly.

Collar styles

Names for specific styles of collars vary with the vagaries of fashion. In the 1930s and 1940s, especially, historical styles were adapted by fashion designers; thus, the Victorian bertha collar — a cape-like collar fitted to a low scooping neckline  —  was adapted in the 1940s but generally attached to a V-neckline.

Some specific styles of collars include:

Buttoning

Conventions on fastening the buttons on a collar differ globally. In the United States and the United Kingdom, the top button is virtually always left unbuttoned, unless one is wearing a necktie, but unbuttoning two or more buttons is seen as overly casual. By contrast, in Slavic countries, including at least Poland, and Ukraine, the top button is buttoned even in the absence of a tie.

Extended meanings
From the contrast between the starched white shirt collars worn by businessmen in the early 20th century and the blue chambray workshirts worn by laborers comes the use of collar colors in job designation, the "workforce colorwheel". Examples are blue-collar, pink-collar and white-collar.

See also
 Camp shirt
 Chemise
 Collar (BDSM)
 Collar stays
 Detachable collar
 Dress shirt
 Neckline
 Necktie
 Polo neck
 Reticella
 Ruff
 Shirt
 Upturned collar

References

External links

 Collars on Boys Shirts and Blouses:  From the Historical Boys' Clothing website

Neckwear
Necklines
History of clothing